Morley is a suburb of Perth, within the City of Bayswater local government area, situated approximately  northeast of the Perth central business district. It contains the Galleria Shopping Centre, one of Perth's larger shopping centres. Morley bus station is located in the car park of the shopping centre. From the late 1950s, Morley (originally known as Morley Park) began to develop as a major shopping and commercial centre.

The name Morley began appearing on maps around the beginning of the twentieth century and was adopted when the Morley Park Estate was subdivided for urban development after the First World War. The most likely explanation for its use is that it commemorates Charles William Morley, who is known to have farmed in the area during the 1860s and 1870s.

History
The Morley area was in the early days of the Swan River Colony developed with agriculture. The area was originally known as Morley Park. In 1929 a landowner progress association petitioned the Bayswater Road Board for improved roads and lighting for improved transport of produce to markets.

Commercial icons appeared in the late 1950s and early 1960s, including the Wirrina Drive-In, the Morley Park Hotel and the Boans department store. Parallel with the commercial growth, a settlement program resulted in the residential development of Morley. This was achieved through a series of town planning schemes undertaken by Margaret Feilman, the consultant town planner to the Shire of Bayswater. These schemes especially catered to the needs of the home building companies whose style of large scale development was a new phenomenon of the 1960s.

Tonkin Highway was constructed through Morley in 1984, bisecting the suburb.

After Boans burnt down in 1986, the Galleria Shopping Centre was built, opening in 1994.

In 2015 the City of Bayswater adopted an activity centre plan for the improvement of the Morley commercial precinct. It aims to build upon the strengths already present in the City Centre and promote an improved street interface with the Galleria Shopping Centre; Progress Street as the Centre's Main Street; and an enhanced Morley bus station.

In 2019, the last overseas Blockbuster store in Morley closed down, leaving only one remaining location in Bend, Oregon.

Facilities
Morley Recreation Centre facilitates various sporting activities, such as indoor soccer, basketball, badminton, netball, roller skating and roller derby.

Education
Primary schools in Morley:
Hampton Park Primary School (independent public school)
Infant Jesus Primary School (private catholic school)
Morley Primary School (independent public school)
Weld Square Primary School (public school)

High schools in Morley:
Hampton Senior High School (independent public school)
John Forrest Secondary College (independent public school)
Morley Senior High School is located in the nearby suburb of Noranda.

Notable people
Australian test cricketer Michael Hussey, singer Samantha Jade and Victorian Bushranger cricketer David Hussey were all raised in Morley.

References

External links
 City of Bayswater website

 
Suburbs of Perth, Western Australia
Suburbs in the City of Bayswater